Route 181 is a rural state highway in northern Connecticut, running from Barkhamsted to Hartland.

Route description
Route 181 begins as River Road at an intersection with US 44 in southern Barkhamsted. The road heads north into the village of Pleasant Valley, where it briefly overlaps Route 318 across the West Branch Farmington River. Immediately after the river crossing, it intersects with East River Road, an unsigned state highway designated as Special Service Road 482, providing access to Peoples State Forest and leading to the village of Riverton. After , Route 181 turns northeast to follow Center Hill Road towards the Barkhamsted Reservoir. It continues north parallel to, but not quite along, the west side of the reservoir towards the town of Hartland, passing by Barkhamsted Center along the way. In Hartland, it continues for another  before ending at an intersection with Route 20 in Hartland center.

A section of Route 181 in Barkhamsted from the southern terminus to the northern end of the overlap with Route 318 is designated as a scenic road.

History
Route 181 was commissioned in 1932, running from Barkhamsted to Granby. It originally went east across a road that has been submerged by the Barkhamsted Reservoir, and continued east of Route 179 along modern Route 219 to Route 20 in Granby. The reservoir was created in 1940, splitting the route into two. As a result, Route 181 was relocated to its current route along the west side of the reservoir, ending at its current terminus at Route 20. The eastern part of the route became SR 721, which was later reassigned in 1960 as an extension Route 219.

Junction list

References

External links

181
Transportation in Hartford County, Connecticut
Transportation in Litchfield County, Connecticut